Charles Darwin is an eastern suburb in the city of Darwin, in the Northern Territory of Australia.

The suburb is named after Charles Darwin National Park, named after Charles Darwin, which is located within the suburb. The suburb was to be developed as a residential and commercial area but was preserved in April 1997 with the creation of Charles Darwin National Park.

References

Suburbs of Darwin, Northern Territory
Places in the unincorporated areas of the Northern Territory